Little Hormead is a village and former civil parish in the English county of Hertfordshire. It is a few miles away from the small town of Buntingford and near the village of Great Hormead. In 1931 the parish had a population of 149. On 1 April 1937 the parish was abolished and to create Hormead.

St Mary's Church dates from the 11th century. It is no longer in use as a church and is in the care of the Churches Conservation Trust.

See also
 The Hundred Parishes

References

External links

  A Guide to Old Hertfordshire webpage for Little Hormead

Villages in Hertfordshire
Former civil parishes in Hertfordshire
East Hertfordshire District